Ingrid Caven (born 3 August 1938) is a German film actress and singer. She is best known for her roles in several films directed by her husband, Rainer Werner Fassbinder, including Love Is Colder Than Death (1969), Why Does Herr R. Run Amok? (1970), and The American Soldier (1970). She continued to appear in Fassbinder's films after their 1972 divorce until his death in 1982. She has also appeared in Silent Night (1995), 35 Shots of Rum (2009) and Suspiria (2018).

Early life
Caven was born Ingrid Schmidt in Saarbrücken, Germany on 3 August 1938. She had one younger sister, Trudeliese Schmidt (1943–2004), who went on to become an opera singer. Caven's father worked as a tobacco trader. Prior to establishing herself as a film actress in the 1970s, Caven worked as a teacher in Upper Bavaria.

Career
Caven originally began acting onstage in Rainer Werner Fassbinder's antiteater (Anti-Theater) acting troupe in the 1960s. Her film debut was in 1969 in the short film Fernes Jamaica; this was swiftly followed by her first feature film Love Is Colder Than Death, directed by Fassbinder, to whom she was briefly married (1970–72). She also had a supporting role in his film The Merchant of Four Seasons (1970), a drama about a farmer who drinks himself to death. Even after their divorce, Caven remained a frequent collaborator of Fassbinder until his death in 1982, also appearing in his films La Paloma (1974), Fox and His Friends (1975), and Mother Küsters' Trip to Heaven (1975).

Her career was at its peak in the 1970s and early 1980s, mostly in film. In the 1970s, while making films in France, Caven became acquainted with fashion designer Yves Saint Laurent, and became one of his muses; he designed one of her stage costumes during her career as a singer.

In 1979 she was a member of the jury at the 29th Berlin International Film Festival. In 1981 Caven starred alongside Carole Bouquet in the film Day of the Idiots as a doctor, and the next year she won an award for Outstanding Individual Achievement: Actress at the German Film Awards for her performance as Inga in the film .

In 2000 she appeared in Rosa von Praunheim's film Fassbinder's Women. Caven has appeared in several films since the turn of the millennium, including supporting parts in Claire Denis's 35 Shots of Rum (2009), and Luca Guadagnino's American remake of Suspiria (2018).

Personal life
Caven has lived in Paris since 1977. She resides with her partner, French writer Jean-Jacques Schuhl, whose book Ingrid Caven won the Prix Goncourt in 2000.

Selected filmography

Discography

Albums 
 Au Pigall's (1978 LP Barclay, live in Paris, re-released on CD Barclay in 2001)
 Der Abendstern (1979 LP RCA, re-released on CD Viellieb Rekords in 1999)
 Live In Hamburg (1980 LP RCA, concert at Audimax Hamburg, May 9, 1980)
 Erinnerungen An Édith Piaf (1983 LP RCA, Édith Piaf chansons with German lyrics)
 Spass (1986 LP Schariwari)
 Chante Piaf 'En Public''' (1989 LP Clever, recorded in 1988, live at Théâtre de l'Athénée, Paris, re-released on CD Fpr Music in 2001)
 Chambre 1050 (1996 CD Arcade/2000 CD Tricatel, 13 songs from Helle Nacht in French)
 Helle Nacht (1998 CD Viellieb Rekords, 16 songs, German version of Chambre 1050)

Soundtracks 
 Chansons und Themen aus Fassbinder Filmen (1994 CD Alhambra, includes 3 Caven songs from the movie "Mutter Küsters Fahrt zum Himmel/Mother Kuesters Goes To Heaven", 1975)
 Hors saison'' (CD released in Japan in 1993, includes 6 songs sung by Ingrid Caven)

References

Works cited

External links

 Collection of articles on Ingrid Caven's film roles

1938 births
Best Actress German Film Award winners
German film actresses
Living people
People from Saarbrücken
20th-century German actresses
21st-century German actresses
German women singers
German expatriates in France